Jundy Maraon (born 25 February 1985 in Molave, Zamboanga del Sur) is a Filipino professional boxer. Nicknamed as "Batang Gwaping" (Tagalog for "pretty boy"), Maraon was a former WBO Asia Pacific bantamweight champion.

Boxing career
Maraon made his professional debut on 26 July 2003, defeating Rogelio Oro at Ipil, Zamboanga Sibugay, Philippines.

References

External links
 

1985 births
Living people
Bantamweight boxers
Southpaw boxers
Filipino male boxers
People from Zamboanga del Sur